Selim Sesler (1957 – May 9, 2014) was a Turkish clarinet virtuoso of Romani heritage.

Early years
Selim Sesler was born at Yenimescit neighborhood in Keşan town of Edirne Province in 1957. His Romani parents originate from Drama, Greece, who moved to Turkey and settled at İbriktepe village of İpsala, Edirne as a result of population exchange between Greece and Turkey in 1923.

He initially learnt blowing the zurna, a popular simple woodwind instrument used to accompany the drum in Turkish folk music. However, in the 1960s, he followed his younger friends and switched over to the clarinet, a finer instrument. At the age of 14, he began to play in village weddings and fairs. He learned to read musical notation only when he served in the military after being conscripted.

Musical career
In the 1980s, he moved to Istanbul, where he joined Romani music bands, and improved his skills. Sesler performed in restaurants, music halls, night clubs, and weddings. He took part at the musical theatre of Ferhan Şensoy, and recorded some small-budget albums.

In 1997, Brenna MacCrimmon met him while performing in a night club in Istanbul, and offered to do an album with him, which came out as Karşılama. The next year, Sesler joined her on a tour in Canada and represented the music of Turkish Romani people and of Rumelia, the area from where his family came. Before he rose to fame in his own country, he drew the attention of foreigners.  He held concerts at Barbican Centre in London, New York City, Boston, and Chicago. His albums were also on sale  abroad, in the United States, in Europe, in Canada, and even in Japan. Fiachra Gibbons of The Guardian called him "the Coltrane of the clarinet".

Following his extensive experience, he developed a rich repertoire and a unique playing style, which gave his work a vivid quality. He became recognized as the head interpreter of Romani music by Romani as well as non-Romani people for his improvisations in wedding music and dance melodies. He was introduced to the Turkish audience when he was featured in the Golden Bear-winning movie Head-On (2004) of the Turkish-German director Fatih Akın. Sesler's next Akın-movie was the musical documentary Crossing the Bridge: The Sound of Istanbul (2005).

Sesler's last known performance on record was Minor Empire's Second Nature album.

Health problems and death
In 2005, Sesler began suffering from coronary heart disease. He was treated at first with a coronary stent  in 2009, and later a ventricular assist device and was on the waiting list for a heart transplant. Since February 2012, his life relied on the world's tiniest device. During an interview with a major daily newspaper in August 2012, he posed with his clarinet, and expressed his hope that "he will be free again when he gets a heart transplanted".

In the evening hours of May 9, 2014, Selim Sesler died at the age of 57 in a hospital in Istanbul, where he was being treated. He was laid to rest in his hometown in Keşan. Sesler is survived by his wife and three children.

Albums
Karşılama with Brenna MacCrimmon, 1998
Keşan'a Giden Yollar (The Road to Keşan) (2000), 1999 - by Kalan Müzik
Oğlan Bizim Kız Bizim (Anatolian wedding), 2006 - by Doublemoon Records
Romanes Clarinet, 2007 - by Özlem Müzik
Second Nature with Minor Empire, 2011

References

1957 births
2014 deaths
People from Keşan
Turkish people of Greek descent
Turkish Romani people
Turkish clarinetists